Liolaemus aureum, the golden lizard, is a species of lizard in the family  Liolaemidae. It is native to Chile.

References

aureum
Reptiles described in 2018
Reptiles of Chile
Endemic fauna of Chile